Kepler-22b (also known by its Kepler object of interest designation KOI-087.01) is an exoplanet orbiting within the habitable zone of the Sun-like star Kepler-22. It was discovered by NASA's Kepler Space Telescope in December 2011 and was the first known transiting planet to orbit within the habitable zone of a Sun-like star, where liquid water could exist on the planet's surface. Kepler-22 is too dim to be seen with the naked eye.

Kepler-22b's radius is roughly about twice that of Earth. Its mass and surface composition are unknown. However, an Earth-like composition for the planet has been ruled out; it is likely to have a volatile-rich composition with a liquid or gaseous outer shell. The only parameters of the planet's orbit that are currently available are its orbital period (about ) and its inclination (approximately 90°). Evidence suggests that the planet has a moderate surface temperature, assuming that the surface is not subject to extreme greenhouse heating.

The planet's first transit was observed on 12 May 2009. Confirmation of the existence of Kepler-22b was announced on 5 December 2011.

Physical characteristics
Kepler-22b is an extrasolar planet orbiting around the star Kepler-22. It was discovered by the Kepler Space Telescope in December 2011.

Mass, radius and temperature

Kepler-22b's radius is roughly 2.4 times that of Earth. Its mass and surface composition remain unknown, with only some very rough estimates established: it has fewer than 124 Earth masses at the 3-sigma confidence limit, and fewer than 36 Earth masses at 1-sigma confidence. The adopted model in Kipping et al. (2013) does not reliably detect the mass (the best fit is 52.8 ).

Kepler-22b, dubbed by scientists as a 'water world', might be an 'ocean-like' planet. It might also be comparable to the water-rich planet Gliese 1214 b although Kepler-22b, unlike Gliese 1214 b, is in the habitable zone. An Earth-like composition is ruled out to at least 1-sigma uncertainty by radial velocity measurements of the system. It is thus likely to have a more volatile-rich composition with a liquid or gaseous outer shell; this would make it similar to Kepler-11f, the smallest known gas planet. Natalie Batalha, one of the scientists on the Kepler Space Telescope project, has speculated, "If it is mostly ocean with a small rocky core, it's not beyond the realm of possibility that life could exist in such an ocean". This possibility has spurred SETI to perform research on top candidates for extraterrestrial life.

Host star

The host star, Kepler-22, is a G-type star that is 3% less massive than the Sun and 2% smaller in volume. The star is about 4 billion years old. In comparison, the Sun is 4.6 billion years old.

The apparent magnitude of Kepler-22 is 11.5, which means it is too dim to be seen with the naked eye.

Orbit
From Earth, the planet appears to make a transit across the disk of its host star.
In order to obtain further information about the details of the planet's orbit, other methods of planetary detection, such as the radial velocity method, need to be used. While such methods have been performed on the planet since its discovery, these methods have not yet detected an accurate value  for the eccentricity of the planet and so (as of March 2012) only an upper limit for the mass of the planet has been set by astronomers.

Habitability

The average distance from Kepler-22b to its host star Kepler-22 is about 15% less than the distance from Earth to the Sun but the luminosity (light output) of Kepler-22 is about 25% less than that of the Sun. This combination of a shorter average distance from the star and a lower stellar luminosity are consistent with a moderate surface temperature at that distance, if it is assumed that the surface is not subject to extreme greenhouse heating.

If Kepler-22b moves in a highly elliptical orbit, its surface temperature variance will be very high.

Climate
Scientists can estimate the possible surface conditions as follows:

Recent estimates suggest that Kepler-22b has more than a 95% probability of being located in the empirical habitable zone defined by the recent Venus and early Mars limits (based on estimates of when these planets may have supported habitable conditions), but less than a 5% chance of being located in the conservative habitable zone within the Circumstellar habitable zone, (estimated from a 1D cloud-free radiative-convective model).

Limits on satellites
The Hunt for Exomoons with Kepler (HEK) project has studied the Kepler photometry of the planet, to find any evidence of transit timing and duration variations that may be caused by an orbiting satellite. Such variations were not found, so ruling out the existence of any satellites of Kepler-22b with a mass greater than 0.54 Earth masses.

Discovery and observation
The planet's first transit in front of its host star was observed on Kepler's third day of scientific operations, on 12 May 2009. The third transit was detected on 15 December 2010. Additional confirmation data was provided by the Spitzer Space Telescope and ground-based observations. Confirmation of the existence of Kepler-22b was announced on 5 December 2011.

Past transit dates

Appearances in media
Kepler-22b is used as a plot device for the 2012 teen science fiction novel Kepler 22b by Bangladeshi author Muhammad Zafar Iqbal.

Kepler-22b is used as a map in Łukasz Jakowski's video games Age of Civilizations (2014) and Age of History II (2017, known as Age of Civilizations 2 until 2020). In AoH2, there are 404 provinces that players must control to win the game.

Kepler-22b is used as the setting for the 2019 children's science fiction book series Kepler by Sri Lankan author Binendra.

Kepler-22b is used as the home planet of Andan, the main character from the alternate reality game (A.R.G.) created by the YouTube channel Dad Feels in 2019.

Kepler-22b is used as the setting for the 2020 U.S. TV series Raised by Wolves, which was filmed using South Africa as a substitute for the planet.

Kepler-22b is the title of a song on Omnium Gatherum, the 20th studio album by King Gizzard & the Lizard Wizard.

Kepler-22b was mentioned in Star Trek: Strange New Worlds in the episode "Spock Amok".

See also

Earth analog
Gliese 163 c
Gliese 581d
Gliese 581g
Gliese 667 Cc
Kepler-452b
Kepler-62f
Kepler-1229b
HD 85512 b
Kepler-69c
Kepler-186f
PH2
Planetary habitability

References

External links

 "NASA's Kepler Confirms Its First Planet In Habitable Zone"  (NASA)
 "Kepler discoveries: Kepler-22b: 'a yearly orbit of 289 days'" (NASA)
 "View of Kepler 22-b Sky Location" (Worldwide Telescope)
 
 
 Kepler mission newsfeed

Kepler-22
Transiting exoplanets
Exoplanets discovered in 2011
Exoplanets in the habitable zone
Super-Earths in the habitable zone
22b
Cygnus (constellation)